Viroconium or Uriconium, formally Viroconium Cornoviorum, was a Roman city, one corner of which is now occupied by Wroxeter, a small village in Shropshire, England, about  east-south-east of Shrewsbury. At its peak, Viroconium is estimated to have been the 4th-largest Roman settlement in Britain, a civitas with a population of more than 15,000. The settlement probably lasted until the end of the 7th century or the beginning of the 8th. Extensive remains can still be seen.

Toponym
Viroconium is a Latinised form of a toponym that was reconstructed as Common Brittonic *Uiroconion ("[city] of *Uirokū". *Uirokū ( "man-wolf") is believed to have been a masculine given name meaning "werewolf".

The original capital of the local British tribe of the Cornovii was the impressive hillfort on the Wrekin known as  *Uiroconion. When the Cornovii were eventually subdued by the Romans, their capital was moved to Wroxeter and given its Roman name. Hence the term "Cornoviorum" distinguishes the site as the Viroconium "of the Cornovii", the Celtic tribe whose settlement became civitas.

History

Roman

Wroxeter was first established in the early years of the Roman conquest of Britain as a frontier post for a cohort of Thracian Auxilia who were taking part in the campaigns of the governor, Publius Ostorius Scapula. The site is strategically located near the end of Watling Street, the primary Roman trunk road that ran across Britannia from Dubris (Dover). The post was a key frontier position because it defended the River Severn valley as it come out of Cambria (Wales) as well as protecting the route to the south that lead to the Wye valley.

In the mid 1st century Caesar's Legio XIV Gemina took over the site from the Thracian Auxilia in preparation for the invasion of Wales and replaced the fort with a much larger legionary fortress. In 78 governor Gnaeus Julius Agricola led campaigns to suppress the tribes in North Wales and the druids on Ynys Môn. In 80 Agricola took Legio XIV Gemina north on his punitive expeditions against the Picts in Scotland. With the departure of Legio XIV Gemina, Legio XX Valeria Victrix took over the fortress.

By the late 80s the fort had ceased to be used by the Roman army after Legio XX Valeria Victrix moved to Deva Victrix. In this period the canabae, or civilian settlement, that had grown up around the legionary fort began turning it into a town. Archaeological research has found that an unfinished legionary bath house in the centre of the town eventually became the town's forum. A decade later a civic street grid was subsuming the plan of the old legionary fort.

The colonnaded forum was started in the 120s covering the unfinished bath house, and with the impressive dedicatory inscription to Hadrian found in excavations dating the completion to 130. It then had many public buildings, including thermae. Simpler temples and shops have also been excavated. At its peak, Viroconium is estimated to have been one of the richest and the fourth largest Roman settlement in Britain with a population of more than 15,000. Its wealth is surprising for what remained a frontier town and is perhaps explained by its access to Wales and to other trade routes.

Between 165 and 185 the forum burned down, including neighbouring shops and houses, and many shop contents were subsequently found in excavations. The forum was rebuilt with several modifications.

Following the end of Roman rule in Britain around 410, the Cornovii tribe divided into Pengwern (Shropshire) and Powys. This socio-political division started Viroconium's decline as an important settlement.

Early medieval period

Although Viroconium served as the early sub-Roman capital of Powys, variously identified with the ancient Welsh cities of Cair Urnarc or Cair Guricon which appeared in the Historia Brittonums list of the 28 civitates of Britain, Viroconium became the site of the court of a sub-Roman kingdom known in Old English as the Wrocensaete, which was the successor territorial unit to Cornovia. Wrocensaete means the ‘inhabitants of Wroxeter’.

The Wroxeter Stone or Cunorix Stone, was found in 1967, with an inscription in an Insular Celtic language, identified by the Celtic Inscribed Stones Project (CISP) at UCL as "partly-Latinized Primitive Irish". The inscription, probably on a re-used gravestone, is dated to 460-475 AD, when Irish raiders had begun to make permanent settlements in South Wales and south-western Britain.

Town life in Viroconium continued in the fifth century, but many of the buildings fell into disrepair. Between 530 and 570, when most Roman urban sites and villas in Britain were being abandoned, there was a substantial rebuilding programme. The old basilica was carefully demolished and replaced with new timber-framed buildings on rubble platforms. These probably included a very large two-storey building and a number of storage buildings and houses. In all, 33 new buildings were "carefully planned and executed" and "skillfully constructed to Roman measurements using a trained labour force". Who instigated this rebuilding programme is not known, but it may have been a bishop. Some of the buildings were renewed three times, and the community probably lasted about 75 years until, for some reason, many of the buildings were dismantled.

The site was probably abandoned peacefully in the second half of the seventh century or the beginning of the eighth. The later minor Wreocensæte sub-kingdom of the Angles emerged in the area when Oswiu conquered Pengwern in 656. Eventually the court of the Kingdom of Powys moved to Mathrafal sometime before 717 following famine and plague in its original location.

Preservation

Although archaeologist Philip A. Barker believed stonework from Viroconium Cornoviorum was used to build the nearby parish churches of Atcham, Wroxeter, and Upton Magna, some substantial remains are still standing. These include "the Old Work" (an archway, part of the baths' frigidarium and the largest free-standing Roman ruin in England) and the remains of a baths complex. These are on display to the public and, along with a small museum, are looked after by English Heritage under the name "Wroxeter Roman City". Some of the more important finds are housed in the Music Hall Museum in Shrewsbury. Most of the town still remains buried, but it has largely been mapped through geophysical survey and aerial archaeology.

Archaeological research of the site is ongoing with further buildings being excavated.

Reconstructed villa

In February 2011 a reconstructed Roman villa was opened to the public to give visitors an insight into Roman building techniques and how the Romans lived. A Channel 4 television series entitled Rome Wasn't Built in a Day showed how it was built using authentic ancient techniques. The builders were assisted by a team of local volunteers and supervised by archaeologist Dai Morgan Evans, who designed the villa.

Notes

Bibliography

Anderson, J. Corbet. The Roman City of Uriconium at Wroxeter, Salop. – Illustrative of the History and Social Life of Our Romano-British Forefathers. London: J. Russell Smith, 1867.
Atkinson, Donald. Report on the Excavations at Wroxeter (the Roman City of Viroconium) in the County of Salop, 1923–1927. Oxford: Oxford University Press, 1942.
Barker, Philip, Ed. Wroxeter Roman City: Excavations 1966–1980. London: Her Majesty's Stationery Office, 1980.
Barker, Philip, and Webster, Graham. From Roman Viroconium to medieval Wroxeter: recent work on the site of the Roman city of Wroxeter. Worcester: West Mercian Archaeological Consultants, 1990. 
Barker, Philip, and White, Roger. Wroxeter Roman City (English Heritage Guidebooks). Swindon, Wilts.: English Heritage, 1999. 

Bushe-Fox, J. P. Excavations on the Site of the Roman Town at Wroxeter, Shropshire, in 1912 (Society of Antiquaries of London. Research Committee. Report no. 1). Oxford: Society of Antiquaries, 1913.
Bushe-Fox, J. P. Excavations on the Site of the Roman Town at Wroxeter, Shropshire, in 1913: Second Report (Society of Antiquaries of London. Research Committee. Report no. 2). Oxford: Society of Antiquaries, 1915.
Bushe-Fox, J. P. Excavations on the Site of the Roman Town at Wroxeter, Shropshire, in 1914: Third Report (Society of Antiquaries of London. Research Committee. Report no. 4). Oxford: Society of Antiquaries, 1916.
De la Bedoyere, Guy. (1991). The Buildings of Roman Britain.
Ellis, Peter. The Roman Baths and Macellum at Wroxeter. Swindon, Wilts.: English Heritage, 2000. 
Ellis, Peter, and White, Roger. 'Wroxeter Archaeology Excavation and Research on the Defences and in the Town – 1968–1992.' in Transactions of the Shropshire Archaeological and Historical Society, Vol. 78. Shrewsbury, Shrops.: Shropshire Archaeological Society, 2006. 
Fox, George E. A Guide to the Roman City of Uriconium at Wroxeter, Shropshire. Wellington, Shrops.: Shropshire Archaeological Society, 1927.
Frere, S. S. Britannia: a History of Roman Britain. London: Routledge & Kegan Paul Ltd., 1987. 
Gaffney, V. L., and White, R. H. (2007). 'Wroxeter, the Cornovii, and the Urban Process: Final Report on the Wroxeter Hinterland Project 1994–1997', Journal of Roman Archaeology Supplementary Series, No. 68.

Kenyon, Kathleen M. Excavations at Viroconium, 1936–1937. Shrewsbury, Shrops. Shropshire Archaeological Society, 1937.
Rivet, A. L. F., and Smith, Colin. (1979). The Place-Names of Roman Britain.
Urban, Sylvanus. 'The Roman City of Uriconium.' Gentleman's Magazine and Historical Review, 1859. 206: 447–458.
Webster, Graham. The Cornovii. London: Sutton, 1991. 
Webster, Graham. The Legionary Fortress at Wroxeter: Excavations by Graham Webster, 1955–1985. Swindon, Wilts.: English Heritage, 2002. 
Webster, Graham. The Roman Army. London: Grosvenor Museum, 1973. 
Webster, Graham, The Roman Imperial Army: Of the First and Second Centuries A.D. Norman: University of Oklahoma Press, 1998. 
Webster, Graham, and Barker, Philip. Viroconium, Wroxeter Roman City. London: Her Majesty's Stationery Office, 1966 & 1978. 
 
White, Thomas. A Guide to the Ruins of Uriconium, at Wroxeter, Near Shrewsbury. Kessinger Publishing, 2009, . BiblioBazaar, 2010, . Nabu Press, 2010, 
White, Thomas. Uriconium; A Historical Account of the Ancient Roman City, and of the Excavations Made Upon Its Site, at Wroxeter, in Shropshire. General Books, 2010.

External links

BBC: Architectural Heritage
 Wroxeter Roman City: English Heritage
 Teachers' Resource pack on Wroxeter: English Heritage
Viroconium Cornoviorum: Roman Legionary Fortress, British Tribal City – Roman-Britain.co.uk 
Roman Fort and Bridge, Wroxeter, Shropshire – Roman-Britain.co.uk
Wroxeter – Roman Britain's Fourth Largest City: Article by Gareth Evans
 Excavation report by Thomas Wright
1859 Article from Gentleman's Magazine
Wroxeter, the Cornovii, and the Urban Process
Report on Uriconium: Archaeological assessment of Wroxeter, Shropshire

 

50s establishments in the Roman Empire
1st-century establishments in Roman Britain
English Heritage sites in Shropshire
Archaeological sites in Shropshire
Ruins in Shropshire
History of Shropshire
Roman towns and cities in England
Tourist attractions in Shropshire
Former populated places in Shropshire
Sub-Roman Britain
Museums in Shropshire
Museums of ancient Rome in the United Kingdom
Archaeological museums in England
Roman legionary fortresses in England